Gilles de Rais (c. 1405 – 26 October 1440), Baron de Rais, was a knight and lord from Brittany, Anjou and Poitou, a leader in the French army, and a companion-in-arms of Joan of Arc. He is best known for his reputation and later conviction as a confessed serial killer of children.

A member of the House of Montmorency-Laval, Gilles de Rais grew up under the tutelage of his maternal grandfather and increased his fortune by marriage. He earned the favour of the Duke of Brittany and was admitted to the French court. From 1427 to 1435, Rais served as a commander in the French army, and fought alongside Joan of Arc against the English and their Burgundian allies during the Hundred Years' War, for which he was appointed Marshal of France.

In 1434 or 1435, he retired from military life, depleted his wealth by staging an extravagant theatrical spectacle of his own composition, and was accused of dabbling in the occult. After 1432, Rais was accused of engaging in a series of child murders, with victims possibly numbering in the hundreds. The killings came to an end in 1440, when a violent dispute with a clergyman led to an ecclesiastical investigation that brought the crimes to light, and attributed them to Rais. At his trial, the parents of missing children in the surrounding area and Rais's own confederates in crime testified against him. He was condemned to death and hanged at Nantes on 26 October 1440.

Rais is sometimes believed to be the inspiration for the French folktale "Bluebeard" ("Barbe bleue"), but this assumption is controversial.

Early life 
It is not known when Gilles de Rais was born, perhaps in late 1405 to Guy II de Montmorency-Laval and Marie de Craon in the family castle at Champtocé-sur-Loire. Following the deaths of his father and mother in 1415, Gilles and his younger brother René de La Suze were placed under the tutelage of Jean de Craon, their maternal grandfather. Craon was a schemer who attempted to arrange the marriage of 12-year-old Gilles to four-year-old Jeanne Paynel, one of the richest heiresses in Normandy; when the plan failed, he attempted unsuccessfully to unite the boy with Béatrice de Rohan, the niece to the Duke of Brittany.

On 30 November 1420, Craon did substantially increase his grandson's fortune by marrying him to Catherine de Thouars of Brittany, heiress of La Vendée and Poitou. Their only child, Marie, was born in 1433 or 1434.

Military career 

In the decades following the Breton War of Succession (1341–64), the defeated faction led by Olivier de Blois, Count of Penthièvre, continued to plot against the Dukes of the House of Montfort. The Blois faction, which refused to relinquish its claim to rule over the Duchy of Brittany, had taken Duke John VI prisoner in violation of the Treaty of Guérande (1365). Jean de Craon took the side of the House of Montfort. After the Duke's release, Jean de Craon and his grandson Gilles de Rais were rewarded for their "good and notable services" with generous land grants that were converted to monetary gifts.

In 1425, Rais appeared  in the entourage of king Charles VII at Saumur, but he might have been introduced to the royal court before this date. At the battle for the Château du Lude, he killed or took prisoner the English captain Blackburn.

From 1427 to 1435, Rais served as a commander in the Royal Army, distinguishing himself for bravery on the battlefield during the renewal of the Hundred Years' War. In 1429, he fought alongside Joan of Arc in some of the campaigns waged against the English and their Burgundian allies. He was present with Joan when the English Siege of Orléans was lifted.

On 17 July 1429, Rais was one of four lords chosen for the honour of bringing the Holy Ampulla from the Abbey of Saint-Remy to Notre-Dame de Reims for the consecration of Charles VII as King of France. On the same day, he was officially created a Marshal of France.

Following the Siege of Orléans, Rais was granted the right to add a border of the royal arms, the fleur-de-lys on an azure ground, to his own. The letters patent authorizing the display cited his "high and commendable services", the "great perils and dangers" he had confronted, and "many other brave feats". In May 1431, Joan of Arc was burned at the stake in Rouen.

Jean de Craon, Rais' grandfather, died in November 1432, and, in a public gesture to mark his displeasure with Rais' reckless spending of a carefully amassed fortune, left his sword and his breastplate to Rais' younger brother René de La Suze.

Private life 
In either 1434 or 1435, Rais gradually withdrew from military and public life to pursue his own interests: the construction of a splendid Chapel of the Holy Innocents (where he officiated in robes of his own design), and the production of a theatrical spectacle, Le Mystère du Siège d'Orléans. The play consisted of more than 20,000 lines of verse, requiring 140 speaking parts and 500 extras. Rais was almost bankrupt at the time of the production and began selling property as early as 1432 to support his extravagant lifestyle. By March 1433, he had sold all his estates in Poitou (except his wife's) and all his property in Maine. Only two castles in Anjou, Champtocé-sur-Loire and Ingrandes, remained in his possession. Half the total sales and mortgages was spent on the production of his play. It was first performed in Orléans on 8 May 1435. Six hundred costumes were constructed, worn once, discarded, and constructed afresh for subsequent performances. Unlimited supplies of food and drink were made available to spectators at Rais' expense.

In June 1435, family members gathered to put a curb on Rais. They appealed to Pope Eugene IV to disavow the Chapel of the Holy Innocents (he refused) and carried their concerns to the king. On 2 July 1435, a royal edict was proclaimed in Orléans, Tours, Angers, Pouzauges and Champtocé-sur-Loire denouncing Rais as a spendthrift and forbidding him to sell any more property. No subject of Charles VII was allowed to enter into any contract with him, and those in command of his castles were forbidden to dispose of them. Rais' credit fell immediately and his creditors pressed upon him. He borrowed heavily, using his objets d'art, manuscripts, books and clothing as security. When he left Orléans in late August or early September 1435, the town was littered with precious objects he was forced to leave behind. The edict did not apply to Brittany, and the family was unable to persuade the Duchy of Brittany to enforce it.

Occult involvement 
In 1438, according to testimony at his trial by the priest Eustache Blanchet and the cleric François Prelati, Rais sent out Blanchet to seek individuals who knew alchemy and demon summoning. Blanchet contacted Prelati in Florence and persuaded him to take service with his master. Having reviewed the magical books of Prelati and a traveling Breton, Rais chose to initiate experiments, the first in the lower hall of his castle at Tiffauges, attempting to summon a demon named Barron. Rais provided a contract with the demon for riches that Prelati was to give to the demon later.

As no demon manifested after three tries, the Marshal grew frustrated with the lack of results. Prelati said Barron was angry and required the offering of parts of a child. Rais provided these remnants in a glass vessel at a later evocation, but to no avail, and the occult experiments left him bitter and his wealth severely depleted.

Child murders 

In his confession, Rais said he committed his first assaults on children between spring 1432 and spring 1433. The first murders occurred at Champtocé-sur-Loire, but no account of them survived. Shortly after, Rais moved to Machecoul, where, according to his confession, he killed, or ordered to kill, a large but uncertain number of children after he raped them.

The first documented case of child-snatching and murder concerns a 12-year-old boy called Jeudon (first name unknown), an apprentice to the furrier Guillaume Hilairet. Rais' cousins Gilles de Sillé and Roger de Briqueville asked the furrier to lend them the boy to take a message to Machecoul, and, when Jeudon did not return, the two noblemen told the inquiring furrier that they were ignorant of the boy's whereabouts and suggested he had been carried off by thieves at Tiffauges to be made into a page. At Rais' trial, the events were attested to by Hilairet and his wife, the boy's father Jean Jeudon, and five others from Machecoul.

In his 1971 biography of Rais, Jean Benedetti tells how the children who fell into Rais' hands were put to death:

Rais' bodyguard Étienne Corrillaut, known as Poitou, was an accomplice in many of the crimes and testified that his master stripped the child naked and hung him with ropes from a hook to prevent him from crying out, then masturbated upon the child's belly or thighs. If the victim was a boy he would touch his genitals (particularly testicles) and buttocks. Taking the victim down, Rais comforted the child and assured him he only wanted to play with him. Rais then either killed the child himself or had the child killed by his cousin Gilles de Sillé, Poitou or another bodyguard called Henriet. The victims were killed by decapitation, cutting of their throats, dismemberment, or breaking of their necks with a stick. A short, thick, double-edged sword called a braquemard was kept at hand for the murders. Poitou further testified that Rais sometimes abused the victims (whether boys or girls) before wounding them and at other times after the victim had been slashed in the throat or decapitated. According to Poitou, Rais disdained the female victims' sexual organs, and through engaging in sodomy with the child, had taken "infinitely more pleasure in debauching himself in this manner ... than in using their natural orifice, in the normal manner."

In his own confession, Gilles testified that “when the said children were dead, he kissed them and those who had the most handsome limbs and heads he held up to admire them, and had their bodies cruelly cut open and took delight at the sight of their inner organs; and very often when the children were dying he sat on their stomachs and took pleasure in seeing them die and laughed”.

Poitou testified that he and Henriet burned the bodies in the fireplace in Rais' room. The clothes of the victim were placed into the fire piece by piece so they burned slowly and the smell was minimized. The ashes were then thrown into the cesspit, the moat, or other hiding places. The last recorded murder was of the son of Éonnet de Villeblanche and his wife Macée. Poitou paid 20 sous to have a page's doublet made for the victim, who was then assaulted, murdered and incinerated in August 1440.

Trial and execution 

On 15 May 1440, Rais kidnapped a cleric during a dispute at the Church of Saint-Étienne-de-Mer-Morte. The act prompted an investigation by the Bishop of Nantes, during which evidence of Rais' crimes was uncovered. On 29 July, the Bishop released his findings, and he subsequently obtained the prosecutorial cooperation of Rais' former protector, John VI, Duke of Brittany. Rais and his bodyguards Poitou and Henriet were arrested on 15 September 1440, following a secular investigation that corroborated the Bishop's. Rais' prosecution was likewise conducted by both secular and ecclesiastical courts, on charges that included murder, sodomy and heresy.

The extensive witness testimony convinced the judges that there were adequate grounds to establish the guilt of the accused. After Rais admitted to the charges on 21 October, the court canceled a plan to torture him into confessing. Peasants of neighboring villages had earlier begun to make accusations that their children had entered Rais' castle begging for food and were never seen again. The transcript, which included testimony by the parents of many of these children as well as graphic descriptions of the murders provided by Rais' accomplices, was said to be so lurid that the judges ordered the worst parts to be struck from the record.

The number of Rais' victims is not known, as most of the bodies were burned or buried; the number of murders is generally placed between 100 and 200, and a few have conjectured that there were more than 600. The victims ranged in age from 6 to 18 and were predominantly boys.

On 23 October 1440, the secular court heard the confessions of Poitou and Henriet and condemned them both to death, followed by Rais' death sentence on 25 October. Rais was allowed to make confession, and his request to be buried in the church of the monastery of Notre-Dame des Carmes in Nantes was granted.

Execution by hanging and burning was set for Wednesday 26 October. At nine o‘clock, Rais and his two accomplices proceeded to the place of execution on the Ile de Biesse. Rais is said to have addressed the crowd with contrite piety and exhorted Henriet and Poitou to die bravely and think only of salvation. His request to be the first to die had been granted the day before. At eleven o'clock, the brush at the platform was set afire and Rais was hanged. His body was cut down before being consumed by the flames and claimed by "four ladies of high rank" for burial. Henriet and Poitou were executed in similar fashion but their bodies were reduced to ashes in the flames and then scattered.

Question of guilt 
Although Gilles de Rais was convicted of murdering many children by his confessions and the detailed eyewitness accounts of his own confederates and victims' parents, doubts have long persisted about the verdict. Counterarguments are based on the theory that Rais was himself a victim of an ecclesiastic plot or act of revenge by the Catholic Church or French State. In his 2006 book The World of perversion: Psychoanalysis and the impossible absolute of desire, psychoanalyst James Douglas Penney notes that the Duke of Brittany, who was given the authority to prosecute, received all the titles to Rais' former lands after his conviction, and then divided the land among his own nobles. Writers such as secret societies specialist Jean-Pierre Bayard contend he was a victim of the Inquisition.

In 1992, a mock re-trial of Rais was held as a media event in France, sans official involvement of public authorities and the judiciary. The lawyer Jean-Yves Goëau-Brissonnière made a long plea at the UNESCO amphitheatre in May 1992. Then in November 1992, he again organized such an ad hoc "court", at the Luxembourg Palace, to re-examine the source material and evidence available at the medieval trial. A team consisting of lawyers, writers, former French ministers, parliament members, a biologist and a medical doctor led by the writer Gilbert Prouteau and presided over by Judge Henri Juramy found Gilles de Rais not guilty. But, as contemporary French news and academic commentators reported, none of the participants sought professional advice from qualified medievalists.

The proceedings were, in part, turned into a fictionalized biography called Gilles de Rais ou la Gueule du loup [Gilles de Rais; or, the Mouth of the Wolf], narrated by the writer Gilbert Prouteau. "The case for Gilles de Rais's innocence is very strong", Prouteau said, as reported by The Guardian, noting that "[n]o child's corpse was ever found at his castle at Tiffauges" and that, in Prouteau's view, de Rais "appears to have confessed to escape excommunication". He concludes that the accusations appeared to have been "false charges made up by powerful rival lords to benefit from the confiscation of his lands." The journalist Gilbert Philippe of Ouest-France subsequently declared Prouteau "facetious and provocative", claiming further that Prouteau himself thought the retrial was "an absolute joke".

Occultist interpretations 
In the early 20th century, anthropologist Margaret Murray and occultist Aleister Crowley questioned the involvement of the ecclesiastic and secular authorities in the case. Crowley described Rais as "in almost every respect...the male equivalent of Joan of Arc", whose main crime was "the pursuit of knowledge". Murray, who propagated the witch-cult hypothesis, speculated in her book The Witch-Cult in Western Europe that Rais was really a witch and an adherent of a fertility cult centred on the pagan goddess Diana.

Most historians reject Murray's theory. Norman Cohn argues that it is inconsistent with what is known of Rais' crimes and trial. Historians do not regard Rais as a martyr to a pre-Christian religion; other scholars tend to view him as a lapsed Catholic who descended into crime and depravity, and whose real crimes were coincidental to the land forfeitures.

See also 
 List of serial killers before 1900

References

Notes

Footnotes

Bibliography

Historical studies and literary scholarship 
 .
 .
 
 .
 
 
 .
  Matei Cazacu, Barbablù. La vera storia di Gilles de Rais, Mondadori, 2008, .
 
  Ernesto Ferrero, Barbablú : Gilles de Rais e il tramonto del Medioevo, Torino: Einaudi, 2004, XVIII-290 pp. (1st ed. 1998).
 .
 
 
 .
 .
 
 .

Literature 
 
 
 (in Dutch) Dick Berents, Slachtbank. De kindermoorden van Maarschalk Gilles de Rais. Soesterberg: Aspekt, 2013 
 Georges Bordonove, Gilles de Rais, Pygmalion, .
  Juan Antonio Cebrián, El Mariscal de las Tinieblas. La Verdadera Historia de Barba Azul, Temas de Hoy, .
 Joris-Karl Huysmans, Down There or The Damned (Là-Bas), Dover, .
 Reginald Hyatte, Laughter for the Devil: The Trials of Gilles De Rais, Companion-In-Arms of Joan of Arc (1440), Fairleigh Dickinson Univ Press, .
 Hubert Lampo, De duivel en de maagd, 207 p., Amsterdam, Meulenhoff, 1988 (11e druk), . (1e druk: ’s-Gravenhage, Stols, 1955).  Le Diable et la Pucelle. 163 p., Presses universitaires du Septentrion, 2002, .
 Robert Nye, The Life and Death of My Lord, Gilles de Rais. Time Warner Books. .
 Edward Lucie-Smith, The Dark Pageant. GMP Publishers, 1977, .

External links 
 

1440 deaths
15th-century alchemists
15th-century Breton people
15th-century executions by France
Crimes involving Satanism or the occult
Executed French people
Executed French serial killers
Executed people from Pays de la Loire
French male criminals
French murderers of children
French people of Breton descent
French people convicted of child sexual abuse
French people convicted of murder
French rapists
House of Montmorency-Laval
Male serial killers
Marshals of France
Necrophiles
People convicted of murder by France
People excommunicated by the Catholic Church
People executed by France by hanging
People from Maine-et-Loire
People of the Hundred Years' War
Year of birth uncertain
Bluebeard